Victor Trivas (July 9, 1896 – April 12, 1970) was a Russian-Jewish screenwriter and film director.
He was nominated at the 1946 Academy Awards for Best Story for the film The Stranger.

Selected filmography

Screenwriter
 The Brothers Karamazov (1931)
 Mirages de Paris (1933)
 Song of Russia (1944)
 The Stranger (1946)
 Boom in the Moon (1946)
 Where the Sidewalk Ends (1950)
 The Secret of Convict Lake (1951)

Director
 Call of the Blood (1929)
 Hell on Earth (1931)
 On the Streets (1933)
 Tovaritch (1935)
 The Head (1959)

Art director
 The Woman from Berlin (1925)
 Eve's Daughters (1928)
 The Murderer Dimitri Karamazov (1931)

Bibliography
 Langman, Larry. Destination Hollywood: The Influence of Europeans on American Filmmaking. McFarland & Co, 2000.
 Phillips, Alastair. City of Darkness, City of Light: émigré Filmmakers in Paris, 1929-1939''. Amsterdam University Press, 2004

References

External links

1896 births
1970 deaths
Male screenwriters
Russian Jews
Russian male writers
Russian film directors
German-language film directors
Mass media people from Saint Petersburg
20th-century Russian screenwriters
20th-century Russian male writers